Johann Heiss, or Heiß (19 June 1640, Memmingen – February 1704, Augsburg) was a German painter in the Baroque style, known for historical, Biblical and mythological scenes.

Life and work 
His artistic training took place in Memmingen, under the tutelage of the  brothers; Hans Conrad (1581–1669) and Johann (1589–1670). After completing his studies, in 1663, he went to Stuttgart and was in the service of Eberhard III, Duke of Württemberg. In 1675, his works were praised by the art historian Joachim von Sandrart in his book, the Teutsche Academie. After 1677, he lived and worked in Augsburg. While there, he came under the influence of Johann Heinrich Schönfeld.

His works may be seen in museums throughout Germany, as well as at the Louvre, the Kunsthistorisches Museum (Vienna), the Hermitage and the Milwaukee Art Museum.

His work "Manus Dei", ironically made famous due to a forgery of it by Wolfgang Beltracchi that was displayed in the Szépművészeti Múzeum, is now considered lost.

References

Further reading 
 Peter Königfeld, Der Maler Johann Heiss. Memmingen und Augsburg 1640–1704, Konrad, 2001 
 Wolfgang Meighörner, Johann Heiss. Schwäbischer Meister barocker Pracht (exhibition catalog), Robert Gessler, 2002 . Katalog zur Ausstellung im Zeppelin Museum Friedrichshafen, 18. Oktober 2002 – 9. Februar 2003
 Hanns-Paul Ties: "Die Allegorie der Abundantia mit Flussgöttern im Bozner Merkantilpalast. Ein Meisterwerk des Augsburger Malers Johann Heiss/L'Allegoria dell'Abbondanza con divinità fluviali nel Palazzo Mercantile di Bolzano. Un capolavoro del pittore di Augusta Johann Heiss", in: Leo Andergassen (Ed.): Ulrich Glantschnigg 1661–1722. Der Bozner Barockmaler/Il pittore barocco di Bolzano (Vol.5 of Reihe des Merkantilmuseums Bozen/Quaderno, 2013, pgs. 61–63.

External links 

 
 More works by Heiss @ ArtNet

1640 births
1704 deaths
17th-century German painters
German history painters
Mythological painters
People from Memmingen
18th-century German painters
18th-century German male artists